Jolow Dar (also Romanized as Jolow Dār and Jelow Dar) is a village in Khobriz Rural District, in the Central District of Arsanjan County, Fars Province, Iran. At the 2006 census, its population was 657, in 148 families.

References 

Populated places in Arsanjan County